John Hawdon may refer to:
 John Hawdon (sculler)
 John Hawdon (colonial settler)